Alois Brandhofer (born 19 June 1951) is an Austrian clarinettist and retired university professor. He was a professor at the Mozarteum University Salzburg and was principal clarinettist of the Vienna Symphony Orchestra and the Berlin Philharmonic Orchestra.

Life 

From 1972 to 1986, he was principal clarinettist of the Vienna Symphony Orchestra and from 1986 to 1992 principal clarinettist of the Berlin Philharmonic Orchestra. He has toured Europe and overseas as a soloist and chamber musician. Solo concerts with conductors such as C. M. Giulini, T. Guschlbauer, L. Hager, G. Bertini, J. Lopez Cobos, Chr. Eschenbach.

From 1992 until his retirement, Brandhofer was professor at the Mozarteum University in Salzburg.

Brandhofer was a member of the Ensemble of the 20th Century and the Philharmonic Octet Berlin. As a soloist and chamber musician, he has performed with, among others, the Amadeus Quartet, the Haydn Trio Wien, the Gewandhaus Quartet Leipzig, the Thomas Brandis Quartet, Margaret Price, Thomas Christian, András Schiff and Milan Turković and has performed several times at the Salzburg Festival.

Students 
His students include:
 Gaspare Buonomano – (NDR Sinfonieorchester)
 Attila Balogh – (NDR Sinfonieorchester)
 Jochen Tschabrun – (Frankfurt Radio Symphony)
 Mate Bekavac
 Dusan Sodja – (Slovenska filharmonija)
 Florian Mühlberger – (Volksoper Wien)
 Rony Moser – (Qatar Philharmonic Orchestra)
 Beatriz Lopez – (Real Filarmonia de Galicia)
 Walter Seebacher –.
 Simon Reitmaier

Awards 
 1997: Europäischer Kammermusikpreis in Venedig.

Premieres 
 Frank Michael Beyer: Canciones für Klarinette und Ensemble
 Richard Dünser: Sinfonietta concertante für Klarinette und Streichorchester
 Helmut Eder: Trio für Klarinette, Viola und Klavier, op. 104
 Herbert Willi: Stück für Klarinette solo
 Herbert Willi: Froher Gesang – Stück für Klarinette und Klavier

References

Further reading 
 Berliner Philharmoniker: Variationen mit Orchester – 125 Jahre Berliner Philharmoniker, vol. 2, Biografien und Konzerte, Verlag Henschel, May 2007,

External links 
 

Austrian classical clarinetists
Academic staff of Mozarteum University Salzburg
Players of the Berlin Philharmonic
1951 births
Living people
University of Music and Performing Arts Vienna alumni
People from Lower Austria